The following lists events that happened during 1965 in South Africa.

Incumbents
 State President: Charles Robberts Swart.
 Prime Minister: Hendrik Verwoerd.
 Chief Justice: Lucas Cornelius Steyn.

Events

January
 8 – Adam Faith, a British pop singer, cancels his tour of South Africa because the South African government prohibited mixed audiences at concerts.

April
 1 – Frederick John Harris is hanged for exploding the bomb at Johannesburg Park Station that killed 77-year-old Ethel Rhys and injured 23 others on 24 July 1964.

May
 4 – Units of the South African Defence Force begin to be issued with the R1 7.62 mm rifle, made in South Africa under license.

October
 4 – At least 150 are killed when a commuter train derails at the outskirts of Durban.

November
 Rhodes University in Grahamstown installs a computer, the first university in South Africa to do so.

Unknown date
 The African National Congress establishes its headquarters in Morogoro, Tanzania.

Births
 1 February – Dave Callaghan, cricketer.
 14 February – Themba Ndaba, actor.
 17 March – Andrew Hudson, cricketer.
 18 March – Yvonne Chaka Chaka, singer.
 2 June – Thoko Didiza, politician.
 10 June – Tiaan Strauss, rugby player.
 13 July – Hannes Strydom, rugby player.
 25 September – Augustine Makalakalane, football player.
 1 December – Henry Honiball, rugby player.
 18 December – John Moshoeu, footballer. (d. 2015).

Deaths
 1 April – Frederick John Harris, school teacher and bomb planter. (b. 1937)
 1 July – Wally Hammond, English first-class cricketer and South African sports administrator. (b. 1903)
 19 July – Ingrid Jonker, Afrikaans poet. (b. 1933)

Railways

Locomotives
Two new Cape gauge locomotive types enter service on the South African Railways:
 The first of sixty-five Class 33-000 General Electric type U20C diesel-electric locomotives.
 The first of one hundred Class 5E1, Series 4 electric locomotives.

References

South Africa
Years in South Africa
History of South Africa